Mirza Taleb Khan Ordubadi was an Iranian aristocrat from the Ordubadi family, who served as the grand vizier of the Safavid king (shah) Abbas I (r. 1588–1629) from to 1610/1 to 1621, and later as grand vizier of his grandson and successor Safi (r. 1629–1642) from 1632 to 1633.

Biography 
Mirza Taleb was the son of Hatem Beg Ordubadi, and thus belonged to the Ordubadi family, an Iranian family which was descended from the medieval philosopher and polymath Nasir al-Din al-Tusi. Furthermore, Mirza Taleb was also the brother-in-law of the governor of Qandahar, Ali Mardan Khan. In 1610/1, Mirza Taleb was appointed as the grand vizier of Abbas I, thus succeeding his father. He was later replaced by Salman Khan Ustajlu in 1621. In 1632, Mirza Taleb was reappointed as grand vizier by Abbas I's grandson and successor Safi, succeeding the former grand vizier Khalifeh Sultan. A year later, Mirza Taleb was dishonored by Saru Taqi, who then secretly had him assassinated. 

The reason behind these actions was due to a personal hatred Saru Taqi had towards the family of Mirza Taleb Khan, whose father had denied to give Saru Taqi's father a post which he had asked for. Furthermore, Saru Taqi also took over the house of Mirza Taleb, which was in Isfahan, the capital of the Safavid Empire.

References

Sources 

 
 
 
 
 

Grand viziers of the Safavid Empire
17th-century Iranian politicians
1633 deaths
Year of birth unknown
Assassinated Iranian people
Ordubadi family
People from Ordubad
17th-century people of Safavid Iran